Kollagunta Gopalaiyer Ramanathan (13 November 1920 – 10 May 1992) was an Indian mathematician known for his work in number theory. His contributions are also to the general development of mathematical research and teaching in India.

K. G. Ramanathan's early life and his family
K. G. Ramanathan was born in Hyderabad in South India. He completed his B.A. and M.A. in mathematics at Osmania University and the University of Madras respectively before going to Princeton to earn his Ph.D; his advisor was Emil Artin. At Princeton, Ramanathan also worked with Hermann Weyl and Carl Siegel. Thereafter he returned to India to team up with K. S. Chandrasekharan at the Tata Institute of Fundamental Research (TIFR) at Colaba in 1951. At Princeton, for about two years, Ramanathan's neighbour was Albert Einstein, the legendary physicist. He used to sing Carnatic songs of Tyagaraja to Einstein for entertainment.

Ramanathan was married to Jayalakshmi Ramanathan. He had two sons. His father's name was Kollagunta Gopal Iyer, and his mother's name was Ananthalaxmi. His mother died at an early age. He had two sisters and one brother.

Career
At TIFR, he built up the number theory group of young mathematicians from India. For several years, he took interest to study Ramanujan's unpublished and published work. He was an Editorial board member of Acta Arithmetica for over 30 years. He retired from TIFR in 1985.

Awards
Ramanathan was given numerous achievements during his more than 30 years service at TIFR.

 Padma Bhushan, 1983
 Shanti Swarup Bhatnagar Award, 1965
 Fellow of Indian Academy of Sciences
 Fellow of Indian National Science Academy
 Honorary fellow of TIFR.

Selected publications
 On Ramanujan’s continued fraction, KG Ramanathan - Acta Arith, 1984
 Some applications of Kronecker’s limit formula, KG Ramanathan - J. Indian Math. Soc, 1987

References

External links
 
 Obituary, reproduced from Acta Arithmetica,  Author: S. Raghavan 
  K. G. R's Photo  This is reproduced from Acta Arithmetica 64 (1993) 1-6 
    K. G. Ramanathan's Biography

1920 births
1992 deaths
Recipients of the Padma Bhushan in literature & education
Indian number theorists
Presidents of the Indian Mathematical Society
University of Madras alumni
Osmania University alumni
Scientists from Hyderabad, India
20th-century Indian mathematicians
Recipients of the Shanti Swarup Bhatnagar Award in Mathematical Science